Marysville station may refer to:

 Marysville station (California), U.S., until 1999
 Marysville Station: Border Patrol in Marysville, Michigan, U.S.
 The Pony Express stop in Marysville, Kansas, U.S., 1860–1861